The AB md. 41 (Autoblindat model 1941) was a Romanian-produced armored car prototype from World War II. It was produced by the Reșița works just before Romania had entered the war. The vehicle's main armament was a Czechoslovak-produced 37 mm gun (probably by Škoda). The project didn't pass the prototype stage.

See also

Comparable vehicles
France: Gendron-Somua AMR 39
Germany: Sd.Kfz. 234/1
Italy: Autoblindo Fiat-Ansaldo
United Kingdom: Coventry armoured car
United States: T17E1 Staghound

References

World War II armoured cars
Military history of Romania during World War II
World War II armoured fighting vehicles of Romania
Military vehicles introduced from 1940 to 1944